Göytəpə (also, Goytepe, Göytäpä, Prišib, Prishib, Prishibinsk, Prishibinskoe, and Prishibinskoye) — is a city and the most populous municipality, except for the capital Cəlilabad, in the Jalilabad Rayon of Azerbaijan. It has a population of 15,500. Renamed in 1992, 'Göytəpə' in Azeri means "Blue Hill."

Notable natives 

 Vugar Mursalov — National Hero of Azerbaijan.

Wildlife 
The Caspian tiger used to be found in the Caucasus, before the end of the 20th century. In particular, an 'immense' tiger was killed in Prishibinsk, as Heptner and Sludskii (1972) called it, in 1899.

See also 
 Trans-Caucasus

References

External links 

Populated places in Jalilabad District (Azerbaijan)